, stylized as SUNSOFT, is a Japanese video game developer and publisher.

Sunsoft is the video games division of Japanese electronics manufacturer Sun Corporation. Its U.S. subsidiary operated under the name Sun Corporation of America, though, as in Japan, games published there showed a logo that read only Sunsoft.

History

In April 1971, Sun Electronics Corporation (alternatively called Sun Denshi) was founded in Kōnan, Aichi as a manufacturer and vendor of electronics equipment.

Sun Corporation's history in video games began in October 1978 in arcades with two titles: Block Challenger and Block Perfect. Sun Corporation had several arcade hits in the early 1980s such as Arabian, Ikki and Kangaroo. At the time, its arcade video games were released under its own corporate name of Sun Electronics Corporation.

The brand Sunsoft first appeared in the latter of the 1980s when Sun Corporation began developing original games and technology for the home video game console market, with emphasis mostly on the Famicom. Sunsoft had gone international at that time, and it had the publishing might to secure major licenses of the day (such as Batman and The Addams Family). In the 1990s, Sun Corporation of America joined forces with Acclaim Entertainment to handle ad sales rights to Sunsoft's video games for game consoles. Additionally, a number of Sega games, including Fantasy Zone, Fantasy Zone II and After Burner, were ported for Nintendo consoles by Sunsoft.

Finally, in 1995, Sun Corporation of America heavily restructured in the face of bankruptcy, and all the company's pending projects were either sold to other companies or cancelled.
Former Sunsoft producer René Boutin spoke on Sunsoft's problems before he left the company. Boutin explained in an interview that 

Sun Corporation of America eventually resurfaced with a scant number of video games for the PlayStation and the Game Boy Color, such as Monster Seed. From 1994 to 1998, Sunsoft attempted the fighting game craze by releasing four fighting games: Sugoi Hebereke for the Super Famicom (1994), Galaxy Fight: Universal Warriors for the Neo Geo (1995), Waku Waku 7 for the Neo Geo (1996), and Astra Superstars for Sega ST-V-based arcades (1998). Prior to its re-emergence in the USA, the last games released and published by Sunsoft stateside were Blaster Master: Enemy Below and Power Quest. Citing several factors, like yet-another "next generation" console transition, and high overhead production costs, Sunsoft closed its offices in America and Europe, and initiated a re-organization. Sunsoft has continued to operate out of its corporate headquarters in Japan, developing and publishing role-playing video games, pachinko games and mahjong games, and mobile platform titles in partnership with other companies such as NTT DoCoMo and Yahoo!.

On September 14, 2006, Nintendo announced that Sunsoft was a partner on the Wii's Virtual Console. Although this relationship with Nintendo took more than three years to release any games, on December 4, 2009, Sunsoft announced that it was partnering with GaijinWorks to bring Blaster Master to Virtual Console that month for 500 Wii Points. Also as of December 10, 2009, the company has also acquired Telenet Japan's entire game library. On February 6, 2010, Sunsoft announced the release of Blaster Master: Overdrive for WiiWare, 2 days prior to its release. Afterwards, Sunsoft also released Aero the Acro-Bat, Aero the Acro-Bat 2, and Ufouria: The Saga on Virtual Console.

On December 24, 2021, Sunsoft tweeted to its fans asking for suggestions to remake their old games.

See also

 List of Sunsoft video games
 List of video game developers

Notes

References

External links
Official website (current)
Official website (past)

Companies based in Aichi Prefecture
Japanese brands
Japanese companies established in 1978
Video game companies established in 1978
Video game companies of Japan
Video game publishers